Bárbara Mujica (née Bárbara Moinelo Múgica; stage name Barbara Moinelo; Buenos Aires, March 13, 1944 - Buenos Aires, August 1, 1990) was an Argentine film, stage, and television actress of the 1960s and 1970s. Her mother was the actress Alba Mujica; she was the niece of the director, René Mugica. She died in 1990 of a myocardial infarction.

Filmography 

 Loraldia (El tiempo de las flores) (1991)
 The Girlfriend (1989)
 The Two Waters (1988)
 Debajo del mundo (1987)
 Bad Company (1986)
 Malayunta (1986)
 Gracias por el fuego (1983)
 Yesterday's Guys Used No Arsenic (1976), Laura Otamendi
 The Inheritors (1970)
 The ABC of Love (1967)
 Los guerrilleros (1965), Patricia
 El octavo infierno, cárcel de mujeres (1964), Zulema Puentes
 Las ratas (1962)
 Los que verán a Dios (1961)
 Quinto año nacional (1961)
 Demasiado jóvenes (1958)
 The House of the Angel (1957), Vicenta
 Edad difícil (1956), Alicia Núñez
 El muro (1947)

External links

1944 births
1990 deaths
People from Buenos Aires
Argentine film actresses
Argentine stage actresses
Argentine television actresses
20th-century Argentine actresses